USC&GS Westdahl was a survey ship that served in the United States Coast and Geodetic Survey from 1929 to 1946.

Westdahl was built in 1929 at Portland, Oregon, and entered Coast and Geodetic Survey service that year. She spent her career along the United States West Coast.

On 6 October 1935, Westdahl towed the disabled fishing boat Diana from Point Retreat on the northern tip of Admiralty Island in southeast Alaska to Juneau, Alaska.

Westdahl was retired from Coast and Geodetic Survey service in 1946.

References
NOAA History: Tools of the Trade: Coast and Geodetic Survey Ships: Westdahl
NOAA History, A Science Odyssey: Hall of Honor: Lifesaving and the Protection of Property by the Coast and Geodetic Survey 1845-1907

Ships of the United States Coast and Geodetic Survey
Survey ships of the United States
Ships built in Portland, Oregon
1929 ships